Huntfield Heights is a metropolitan suburb of Adelaide, South Australia. It lies within the City of Onkaparinga and has postcode 5163. The borders of this suburb are Honeypot Road to the north, Main South Road marks the eastern and the southern border, and the Southern Expressway marks the most westerly border. Huntfield Heights used to be the southern half of Hackham West. In the late 1990s it was renamed, after former Noarlunga mayor Walter Morris Hunt.

See also 
History of Adelaide
European settlement of South Australia

References

Suburbs of Adelaide